Tremont station (also known as West Wareham station) was located on Mill Street in West Wareham, Massachusetts. The station was located just east of the former junction of the Cape Cod Branch Railroad and the Fairhaven Branch Railroad.

References

External links

Buildings and structures in Wareham, Massachusetts
Former railway stations in Massachusetts
Stations along Old Colony Railroad lines